Simmelsdorf is a municipality  in the district of Nürnberger Land in Bavaria in Germany.

History 
Famous is the House of Tucher von Simmelsdorf, originating from this place.

References

Nürnberger Land